Ummahat Owaina is a district in Qatar, located in the municipality of Al Rayyan.

Nearby settlements include Al Khaldiya to the east and Umm Al Zubar East in Al-Shahaniya Municipality to the north-east.

Etymology
"Ummahat" is the plural of "umm", which translates to "mother", and is commonly used as a prefix for geographic features. The second word, "owaina", is derived from "ain", which refers to a natural underground spring. This name arose from an important local spring.

References

Populated places in Al Rayyan